In filmmaking, found footage is the use of footage as a found object, appropriated for use in collage films, documentary films, mockumentary films and other works.

Use in commercial film
Historical found footage is often used in documentary films as a source of primary information, giving the viewer a more comprehensive understanding of the subject matter.  Director and cinematographer Ken Burns used archival footage in his films. Baseball (1994), his documentary television series for PBS, incorporates historical footage accompanied by original music or actors reading relevant written documents.

Often fictional films imitate this style in order to increase their authenticity, especially the mockumentary genre. In the dramatized and embellished pseudo-documentary film F For Fake (1973), director Orson Welles borrows all shots of main subject Elmyr de Hory from a BBC documentary,  rather than fabricating the footage himself.

Stuart Cooper's Overlord uses stock footage of the landing on Normandy during World War II to increase realism. The footage was obtained from the Imperial War Museum in the UK. Other parts of the film were shot by Cooper, but using old World War II-era film stock with World War II-era lenses.

Music video and VJing
A certain style of music video makes extensive use of found footage, mostly found on TV, like news, documentaries, old (and odd) films etc. The forefather of found footage music videos was artist Bruce Conner who screened Cosmic Ray in 1961. Prominent examples are videos of bands such as Public Enemy and Coldcut. The latter also project video material during their stage show, which includes live mixing of video footage. Artists such as Vicki Bennett, also known as People Like Us, or the video artist Kasumi with the film Shockwaves, use Creative Commons archives such as the Prelinger Archives.

Practitioners
 Anti-Banality Union
 Martin Arnold
 Craig Baldwin
 Dara Birnbaum
 Abigail Child
 Bruce Conner
 Joseph Cornell 
 Guy Debord
 William Farley
 Péter Forgács
 Barbara Hammer
 Ken Jacobs 
 Brett Morgen
 Matthias Müller
Dennis Nyback
 Vivian Ostrovsky
 Paul Pfeiffer
 Rick Prelinger
 Luther Price
 Phil Solomon
 Chick Strand
 System D-128
 Peter Tscherkassky
 René Viénet

See also
 Experimental film
 Found Footage Festival
 Mashup (video)
 Montage (filmmaking)
 Vietnam in HD, in which thirteen Americans retell their stories in the Vietnam War paired with found footage from the battlefield
 VJing
 WWII in HD, in which twelve American service members retell their stories in World War II paired with found footage from the battlefield
Remix culture

References

Further reading
 Cut: Film as Found Object in Contemporary Video, Stefano Basilico, Milwaukee Art Museum 2004.
 Found Footage Film, Cecilia Hausheer, Christoph Settele, Luzern 1992, 
 Films Beget Films, Jay Leyda, London, George Allen & Unwin 1964.
 Recycled Images: The Art and Politics of Found Footage Films, William C. Wees, Anthology Film Archives, New York: 1993.

External links
The Recycled Cinema – "A Research Site Devoted to the Past and Future of Found Footage Film and Video"
Found Footage Magazine – a semi-annual publication with theoretical, analytical and informative contents related to found footage filmmaking

Cinematic techniques
Experimental film
Found object
Collage
Contemporary art